Paul Speer (born 1952 in Lewiston, Idaho) is a Grammy nominated guitarist, composer, and record producer.   He has released several solo albums, music video albums, and collaborations with other artists such as pianist David Lanz, drummer Scott Rockenfield of Queensrÿche, Paul Lawler, and vocalist Satine Orient.

Early years
Paul Speer took up guitar at the age of nine and played his first paid gig at age twelve in a trio with brothers Neal and Gary.  In 1969, the expanded group now known as the Stone Garden, recorded the single "Oceans Inside Me" and pressed 300 copies, a rare collector item today.

Speer attended music school at the University of Idaho in Moscow before moving to Seattle to play in nightclub bands.  In the mid 1970s, he took up residence in Los Angeles where his interest expanded into audio production and engineering.  Speer returned to Seattle in the late 1970s and began producing records in local recording studios and in his own studio.

Career highlights
Catero Records (Fred Catero) of San Francisco signed Speer and released his first solo album Collection 983: Spectral Voyages in 1984.  That was followed by two very successful music and video collaborations with David Lanz and director Jan Nickman, for the films Natural States (1985) and Desert Vision (1987).

Speer and Scott Rockenfield, drummer for the metal band Queensrÿche, teamed in 1997 to create another music and video work, the Grammy nominated TeleVoid.  They also recorded Hells Canyon in 2000, a progressive rock opus inspired by places and events in the spectacular Hells Canyon region of Idaho.

Oculus, a music and video album inspired by places in Italy, was released by Speer's imprint label Rainstorm Records in 2008.  In 2009, he collaborated with British musician Paul Lawler and French vocalist Satine Orient on the album Wonders.

In addition to his own productions, Paul Speer has been a prolific record producer with more than 250 albums to his credit.

Discography
Solo
Collection 983: Spectral Voyages - 1984 - Catero Records (re-released on Rainstorm Records 2000)
Collection 991: Music+Art - 1992 - Miramar Recordings
Quiet Thoughts - 1998 - Rainstorm Records
Oculus - 2008 - Rainstorm Records
Ax Inferno - 2013 - Rainstorm Records
Sonoran Odyssey - 2020 - Rainstorm Records

Collaborations
Stone Garden (band member) - "Oceans Inside Me" single - 1969 - Angelus Bell Records
Natural States (with David Lanz) - 1985 - Narada/EMI Records /
Desert Vision (with David Lanz) - 1987 - Narada/EMI Records
Shades of Shadow (with Leroy Quintana) - 1990 - Miramar Recordings
Bridge of Dreams (with David Lanz) - 1993 - Narada/EMI Records 
TeleVoid (with Scott Rockenfield) - 1997 - Miramar Recordings
Stone Garden (band member) - 1998 (full album of music recorded 1965-1972) - Rockadelic Records
Hells Canyon (with Scott Rockenfield) - 2000 - Rainstorm Records
Wonders (with Paul Lawler and Satine Orient) - 2009 - Rainstorm Records

References

 Paul Speer Interview https://mwe3.com/reviews/PaulSpeer2013/

 Review https://bluewolf-reviews.com/music/electronica/sonoran-odyssey/

Magazine - New Age and New Sounds, September 2008, vol 188, pgs 86-88, www.agendo.it, Italy
Magazine - Shindig, January–February 2009, Vol 2, no 8, pgs 28-29, UK

External links

1952 births
Living people
People from Lewiston, Idaho
New-age guitarists
Guitarists from Idaho
20th-century American guitarists